Glen Osmond Road is a major section of the Princes Highway (and Highway 1) in the city of Adelaide, South Australia. Connecting the Adelaide city centre with the Adelaide Hills via the South Eastern Freeway; Glen Osmond Road carries half of Adelaide's freight traffic and is the major commuter route from the southern Adelaide Hills. It is designated part of route A1.

Route
Glen Osmond Road starts at the intersection with South Terrace along the southern border of the Adelaide city centre and heads southeast, intersecting with Hutt and Greenhill Roads through the Adelaide Park Lands, continues southeast through Eastwood and Frewville, before ending at the intersection with Cross Road, Portrush Road and South Eastern Freeway in Glen Osmond.

Glen Osmond Road houses a strip shopping precinct on the section between Greenhill and Fullarton Roads. The precinct is largely populated by independent boutiques. It is a community main street stationed in the leafy suburbs of Adelaide's south east. It was earlier known as "The Gateway" because of its connection between the Adelaide CBD and Hills.

Glen Osmond Road Precinct Association
The Glen Osmond Road Precinct Association (GORPA) is an association guiding the growth and development of Glen Osmond Road and marketing the local business community. GORPA is funded by an exclusive rate applied to properties on the City of Unley side of Glen Osmond Road.

Glen Osmond Road forms the boundary of two Council areas — the City of Unley and City of Burnside. The councils work together to promote the local community. Each council has staff dedicated for Business and Economic Development.

Major intersections

See also 

 Highway 1 (Australia)
 Highway 1 (South Australia)

References

External links 
 Glen Osmond Road Precinct Directory

City of Burnside
Roads in Adelaide
Highway 1 (Australia)